King Philip may refer to

 Philip II of Macedon (380–336 BC), Greek conqueror and father of Alexander the Great
 Philippe of Belgium (born 1960)
 Ee-mat-la (died 1839), war leader of the Seminole in the Second Seminole War 
 Metacomet (died 1676), war leader of the Wampanoag in King Philip's War
 Philip I of Castile "the Handsome" (1478–1506)
 Philip I of France (1052–1108)
 Philip II of France (1165–1223)
 Philip III of France, "the Bold" (1245–1285)
 Philip IV of France (Philip I of Navarre), "the Fair" (1268–1314)
 Philip V of France (Philip II of Navarre), "the Tall" (1293–1322)
 Philip VI of France, "the Fortunate" (1293–1350)
 Philip III of Navarre (1301–1343)
 Philip I Philadelphus Seleucid (95–84/83 BC)
 Philip II Philoromaeus last Seleucid (65–63 BC)
 Philip II of Spain and I of Portugal (1526–1598), also King of England and Ireland by marriage (1554–1558)
 Philip III of Spain and II of Portugal (1578–1621)
 Philip IV of Spain and III of Portugal (1605–1665)
 Philip V of Spain (1683–1746)
 Philip VI of Spain, more often known by his Spanish name of Felipe VI (born 1968)
 Philip of Swabia, king of Germany and duke of Swabia (1177–1208)
 Philip of Sweden (12th century) 
 Philip Simonsson, Bagler pretender and ruler of eastern Norway (1207–1217) during the reign of Inge II of Norway
 Prince Philip, Duke of Edinburgh (1921–2021), consort of Elizabeth II, Queen of the United Kingdom

See also
Philip (disambiguation)
Emperor Philip (disambiguation)
Prince Philip (disambiguation)
Philip the Apostle